IAS may refer to:

Science 
 Institute for Advanced Study, in Princeton, New Jersey, United States
 Image Analysis & Stereology, the official journal of the International Society for Stereology & Image Analysis.
 Iowa Archeological Society, United States
 Iranian Arachnological Society, for the study of arachnids in Iran
 International AIDS Society, an association of HIV/AIDS professionals
 Institute of Agricultural Sciences, Banaras Hindu University, in India
 Institute for Advanced Study at University of Minnesota in Minneapolis, Minnesota
 Institute of Advanced Study (Durham) in Durham, North East England
 IEEE Industry Applications Society

Government 
 Indian Administrative Service, the Indian administrative civil service
 Intergovernmental Affairs Secretariat (Canada)

Finance 
 International Accounting Standards
 Internal Audit Service (European Commission)
 Investment Analysts Society of Southern Africa
 various numbered International Financial Reporting Standards

Religion 
 International Association of Scientologists
 International Association of Sufism

Politics 
 Institute for Anarchist Studies
 Izquierda Asturiana, a political party in Spain
 Immunisation Awareness Society, a New Zealand anti-vaccination group
 International Aviation and Shipping emissions, specifically greenhouse gas emissions arising from those sectors (the term also used in the United Kingdom Climate Change Act 2008)

Aeronautics 
 Indicated airspeed
 Institute of Aerospace Sciences, in the United States
 Institut aéronautique et spatial, in France
 Iași International Airport, IATA designation for the airport in Iași, Romania
 IAS Cargo Airlines, a British airline

Computing
 IAS machine, the first electronic computer built at the Institute for Advanced Study
 Interactive Application System, a DEC PDP-11 operating system
 Internet Application Server, alternate name for Oracle Application Server
 Internet Authentication Service, a component of Windows Server

Other uses 
 Instituto Ayrton Senna, an NGO in Brasil
 Insulin autoimmune syndrome, a rare cause of reversible autoimmune hypoglycemia
 International American School of Warsaw, a preK–12 school in Poland
 International Automated Systems, an American company
 IAS Limited an Australian-based gambling company
 Internal anal sphincter, human anatomy

See also
 Institute for Advanced Study (disambiguation)